Datuk Seri Saifuddin Nasution bin Ismail (Jawi: سيف الدين ناسوتيون بن اسماعيل; born 7 December 1963) is a Malaysian politician who has served as the Minister of Home Affairs in the Pakatan Harapan (PH) administration under Prime Minister Anwar Ibrahim as well as Senator since December 2022. He also served as the Minister of Domestic Trade and Consumer Affairs in the PH administration under former Prime Minister Mahathir Mohamad from July 2018 to the collapse of the PH administration in February 2020. He served as the Member of Parliament (MP) for Kulim-Bandar Baharu from May 2018 to November 2022 and for Machang from March 2008 to May 2013 as well as Member of the Penang State Legislative Assembly (MLA) for Pantai Jerejak since May 2018 and MLA of Kedah for Lunas from November 2000 to March 2004. He is a member of the People's Justice Party (PKR), a component party of the PH opposition coalition. He has also served as the Secretary-General of PKR from January 2010 to his resignation in October 2014 and again since November 2016 as well as Secretary-General of PH since March 2020.

Political career
Saifuddin was initially a member of the youth wing of the ruling UMNO party but was expelled in 1999 as its assistant secretary. An ally of Anwar Ibrahim, Saifuddin then defected to the opposition KeADILan party, which later became PKR.

Saifuddin election debut was in the 1999 general election contesting the seat of Padang Serai, Kedah for PKR but lost. A year later, he won the Kedah State Assembly seat of Lunas in a 2000 by-election. However, he failed in his bid to be elevated to the federal Parliament in the 2004 election, losing to Lim Bee Kau of the Barisan Nasional in the seat of Padang Serai again. In the 2008 election, Saifuddin contested and won the federal seat of Machang in Kelantan. For the 2013 election, he returned to Kedah to contest the seat of Kulim-Bandar Baharu, but was defeated by UMNO's Abd. Aziz Sheikh Fadzir. Somehow in 2018 election, Saifuddin made a comeback to win both the Kulim-Bandar Baharu parliamentary seat and Pantai Jerejak, Penang state seat but lost his parliamentary seat in 2022. He later was appointed as senator to serve as minister in Anwar Ibrahim cabinet.

In January 2010, Saifuddin was appointed the Secretary-General of PKR, replacing Salehuddin Hashim. In 2014, he vacated the post to run for the party's deputy presidency, but was defeated by Azmin Ali. He was once again appointed to the post of PKR Secretary-General in November 2016, this time to replace Rafizi Ramli.

Election results

Honours

Honours of Malaysia
  :
  Knight Companion of the Order of Loyalty to the Royal House of Kedah (DSDK) – Dato' (2012)
  :
  Grand Commander of the Order of Malacca (DGSM) – Datuk Seri (2018)

References

External links
 

Living people
1963 births
Government ministers of Malaysia
Members of the Dewan Rakyat
Members of the Penang State Legislative Assembly
Members of the Kedah State Legislative Assembly
People's Justice Party (Malaysia) politicians
Former United Malays National Organisation politicians
University of Putra Malaysia alumni
People from Singapore
Malaysian people of Singaporean descent
Malaysian people of Malay descent
People of Batak descent
Mandailing people
Malaysian Muslims
Singaporean emigrants to Malaysia
People who lost Singaporean citizenship
Citizens of Malaysia through descent
21st-century Malaysian politicians